François de Bourbon, Count of Enghien (23 September 1519 – 23 February 1546) was a French prince du sang from the House of Bourbon-Vendôme, a cadet branch of the House of Bourbon (itself a cadet branch of the Capetian dynasty).  He was the son of Charles de Bourbon, Duke of Vendôme and Françoise d'Alençon.

Given command of the French army in Italy by Francis I of France during the Italian War of 1542, he was the French commander at the successful Franco-Ottoman Siege of Nice in 1543, and he led it to victory at the Battle of Ceresole in a year later in 1544.

His early death at the age of 26 was caused by an accident – specifically by the falling of a heavy chest – in the castle La Roche-Guyon. He was succeeded as Count of Enghien by his younger brother John (Jean), who was also the Count of Soissons.

References

Sources

Enghien, Francois de Vendome, Count of
Enghien, Francois de Vendome, Count of
House of Bourbon-La Marche
Counts of France
16th-century peers of France
1519 births
1546 deaths
People from La Fère
Accidental deaths in France